This is a list of women artists who were born in Russia or whose artworks are closely associated with that country.

A
Taisia Afonina (1913–1994), painter
Sara Alexandri (born 1913), painter
Anna Andreeva (1917–2009), textile artist
Evgenia Antipova (1917–2009), portrait, genre, and still life painter
Tatyana Apraksina (born 1963), graphic artist, illustrator, writer
Mariam Aslamazian (1907–2006), painter
Irina Azizyan (1935–2009), painter

B
Irina Baldina (1922–2009), painter
Varvara Baruzdina (1862–1941), painter
Maria Bashkirtseva (1858–1884), painter
Evgenia Baykova (1907–1997), realist painter, graphic artist
Aleksandra Belcova (1892–1981), Latvian/Russian painter
Olga Beggrow-Hartmann (1862–1922), German/Russian, painter
Angelina Beloff (1879–1969), Russian-born painter, moved to Mexico
Zlata Bizova (1927–2013), painter
Seraphima Blonskaya (1870–1947), painter, art teacher
Elisabeth Boehm (1843–1914), painter, postcard designer
Olga Bogaevskaya (1915–2000), painter
Kseniya Boguslavskaya (1892–1972), avant-garde painter, poet, decorator
Vita Buivid (born 1962), contemporary artist

C
Anastasia Chernyavsky, photographer
Olga and Galina Chichagova (1886–1958 and 1891–1966), children's book illustrators

D
Olga Della-Vos-Kardovskaya  (1875–1952), painter
Alexandra Dementieva (born 1960), digital artist
Irina Dobrekova (born 1931), painter
Olya Dubatova, painter, installation artist

E
Aleksandra Ekster (1882–1949), Russia-French painter, designer
Vera Ermolaeva (1893–1937), avant-garde painter, illustrator

G
Nina Genke-Meller (1893–1954), Ukrainian-Russian avant-garde artist, designer, scenographer
Helen Gerardia (1903–1988), Russian-born American painter
Irina Getmanskaya (born 1939), painter, educator
Natalia Gippius (1905–1994), painter
Natalia Goncharova (1881–1962), avant-garde painter, costume designer, writer
Tatiana Gorb (1935–2013), painter, illustrator, educator
Elena Gorokhova (1935–2014), painter
Elena Guro (1877–1913), futurist painter

K
Svetlana K-Lie (born 1977), multidisciplinary artist based in the UK
Anastasia Khoroshivlova (born 1978), artist, photographer
Maria Kleschar-Samokhvalova (1915–2000), painter
Elena Nikandrovna Klokacheva (1871–c.1943), painter
Maya Kopitseva (1924–2005), still life painter
Tatiana Kopnina (1921–2009), painter, art teacher
Elena Kostenko (1926–2019), painter
Anna Kostrova (1909–1994), realist painter, illustrator
Maya Dmitrievna Koveshnikova (1926–2013), Siberian landscape and still life painter
Marina Kozlovskaya (1925–2019), painter
Sophia Ivanovna Kramskaya (1866–1933), painter

L
Valeria Larina (1926–2008), painter
Anna Leporskaya (1900–1982), painter
Irina Levshakova (1959–2016), painter

M
Tatyana Mavrina (1900–1996), artist and children's book illustrator
Valentina Monakhova (born 1932), painter, art teacher
Liza Morozova (born 1973), contemporary artist, psychologist, writer
Vera Mukhina (1889–1953), sculptor, social realist

N
Irina Nakhova (born 1955), painter, educator
Ida Nappelbaum (1900–1992), writer, photographer
Vera Nazina (born 1931), painter
Ry Nikonova (1942–2014), painter, writer

O
Ry Nikonova (1871–1955), watercolourist, woodcut artist

P
Anna Parkina (born 1979), visual artist
Liubov Popova (1889–1924), cubist abstractionist painter

R
Lubov Rabinovich (1907–2001), painter
Teresa Feoderovna Ries (1874–1950), painter
Vera Rockline (1896–1934), painter
Olga Rozanova (1886–1918), avant-garde painter
Maria Rudnitskaya (1916–1983), painter, art teacher
Galina Rumiantseva (1927–2004), painter
Nadya Rusheva (1952–1969), illustrator
Anastasia Ryabova (born 1985), contemporary artist
Marina Ryndzyunskaya (1877–1946), sculptor

S
Aidan Salahova (born 1964), contemporary artist
Zinaida Serebriakova (1884–1967), painter, social realist
Daria Serenko, (born 1993), curator and artist activist
Nadezhda Shteinmiller (1915–1991), painter, art teacher
Elena Skuin (1908–1986), Latvian-Russian painter, art teacher
Esphyr Slobodkina (1908–2002), illustrator, writer
Galina Smirnova (1929–2015), painter
Varvara Stepanova (1884–1958), Constructivist artist

U
Nadezhda Udaltsova (1885–1961), avant-garde painter, art teacher

V
Nina Tokhtaman Valetova (born 1958), metaphysical realism, fantasy and visionary painter
Nina Veselova (1922–1960), painter
Elena Volkova (1915–2013), painter
Olga Volchkova (born 1970), painter, curator
Ekaterina Vorona (born 1975), sculptor and graphic artist
Eugenia Vronskaya (born 1966), painter

W
Marianne von Werefkin (1860–1938), avant-garde expressionist painter

Y
Josephinne Yaroshevich (born 1946), painter

Z
Olga Zhekulina (1900–1973), painter, puppeteer
Maria Zubreeva (1900–1991), painter, designer

-
Russian
Artists
Artists, women